This is a list of largest town tramway systems that have ever operated. Town tramway systems include all light rail, tram, interurban, streetcar, or other comparable modes of public transport which uses rails while mainly traveling among other traffic. All figures reflect the system at its height. To keep the list manageable, only systems with over 90km of track are included.

List

See also
 List of town tramway systems
 List of tram and light rail transit systems
 List of largest currently operating tram and light rail transit systems
 History of tram and light rail transit systems by country

References

Rail transport-related lists of superlatives
Tram transport-related lists
List Of Town Tramway Systems